This is a list of lighthouses in Somalia.

Lighthouses

See also
List of lighthouses in Djibouti (to the north-west)
List of lighthouses in Somaliland (autonomous region within Somalia)
List of lighthouses in Kenya (to the south-west)
 Lists of lighthouses and lightvessels

References

External links

Somalia
Lighthouses
Lighthouses